A regenerative city is an urban development built on an environmentally enhancing, restorative relationship with the natural systems from which the city draws resources for its sustenance. A regenerative city maintains a symbiotic, mutually beneficial relationship with its surrounding hinterland not only by minimizing its environmental impact but by actively improving and regenerating the productive capacity of the ecosystems from which it depends.

The concept of a Regenerative City was first developed by an International Expert Commission on Cities and Climate Change convened by the World Future Council jointly with Hamburg University for Architecture and Urban Development (HCU) between 2008 and 2011. The Commission consisted of urban planning experts, climate scientists, representatives of the United Nations, politicians and the private sector. The concept was first presented through the report “Regenerative Cities” in 2010 and further expanded
in various subsequent reports as well as in the
book titled “Creating Regenerative Cities” by Herbert Girardet. Since 2011 the
concept was also recurrently discussed during the annual Future of Cities Forum.

The regenerative city
is also included in the principles for the New Urban Paradigm as outlined in The City We Need document compiled by
the UN-Habitat
advocacy and partnership platform the World Urban Campaign.
The City We Need, whose aim is to set key principles and establish essential paths for
building a New Urban Agenda towards the Habitat
III conference,
states that “the city we need is a
regenerative city”.

Examples of cities
committing to the regenerative city concept include the city of Wittenberg in
Germany which declared its intention to become a regenerative city in 2013. Similarly, Iowa
City in the U.S. launched the Regenerative City Initiative in 2014, consisting of
various projects and strategies to transform the city into a regenerative city.

Going beyond urban sustainability 
At the core of the regenerative city concept lies
the understanding that it is essential to go beyond a restrictive definition of
sustainability and embrace a broader model of urban development that puts the
emphasis on the need for cities not to only to sustain but to actively regenerate
the natural resources they need and absorb. While the original
definition of sustainable development states that “sustainable development is a
development that meets the needs of the present without compromising the
ability of future generations to meet their own needs” regenerative urban
development recognizes that considering the speed and scale of current resource
consumption, the ability of future generations to meet their own needs is many
times already compromised. For example, in 2013, by August consumption
worldwide had already overshot the earth's annual natural production. For the rest of the
year humanity was incurring resource debt. Therefore, in light
of the problems related to resource consumption and overshoot, regenerative
cities strive not only to stop consuming natural resources at a rate which is faster
than ecosystems can recover, but reverse the trend by actively improving the
regenerative capacity of ecosystems they rely on.

Linear resource flows in an urbanising world 
Currently most cities are heavily dependent on
resources which are consumed and wasted with little consideration to their
origin or their final destination. Input resources
such as water, food, energy and goods are imported from well beyond the cities´
boundaries to be consumed by city dwellers and discarded in the form of waste
and pollution to air, water and land. In order to meet the increasingly high
level of energy demand, cities import and burn fossil fuels whose output
pollutes the air and increases the level of greenhouse gases which cause
climate change. Raw materials are
continuously extracted to meet an ever increasing consumer demand and very
often exit the consumption chain in the form of waste to landfill that cannot
be reabsorbed by nature. Nutrients and
carbon are removed from farmland as food is harvested, processed and eaten and
the resulting waste is discharged into rivers and coastal waters downstream
from population centres and usually not returned to farmland. Rivers and oceans become
increasingly contaminated by sewage, toxic effluents and mineral run-offs. This deleterious relationship in which cities are unable
to interact in a mutually beneficial way with the ecosystems on which they
depend is putting at risk the long-term viability of urbanization. Regenerative
urban development is based on the understanding that if
urban areas are to continue to offer individuals around the world the prospect
of an improved quality of life and ability to realise their potential and
aspirations, they must embrace their role in ensuring that the earth's life
support systems remain healthy and sound. This can be
achieved by adopting a model of urban development which enables cities to
interact symbiotically with their surrounding environment and actively improve the degraded conditions of their supporting ecosystems.

The regenerative vision 
First of all, the development of a regenerative city
requires a switch in paradigm away from the old linear metabolism – which
allows cities to operate within an isolated segment of the resource cycle – to
a new circular metabolism. Regenerative urban
development seeks to mimic the circular metabolic systems found in nature where all waste becomes organic nutrients for new
growth. In regenerative cities priority is given to closing the urban resource
cycle which means finding value in outputs that are conventionally regarded as
waste and using them as resource inputs in local and regional production
systems.

For example, a regenerative city
reintroduces treated water into the hydrology cycle, sources food from urban
and peri-urban producers, captures the nutrients from its sewage and waste to
be applied to surrounding agricultural land, reduces its dependence on
petroleum products and boosts the deployment of renewable energies particularly
from local sources. Closing resource loops in this way is the first fundamental
step toward regenerative development.

The second
step is to actively work to regenerate the
materials and resources the city uses, making the regenerative city a node of
production. This can be aided
by developing ecosystem service infrastructure within the urban area which
improves the self-sufficiency of cities and their ability to meet their own
demand for energy, food, water and goods from resource within the city's
boundaries or from the surrounding areas. While many cities,
especially megacities and those located in resource-poor regions, may not be
able to meet all their needs within their own borders, they can employ a
concept of subsidiarity: to seek opportunities to optimise urban and
peri-urban production as much as possible before relying on the surrounding
region, only after which they would look further afield. This renewed, enhanced
relationship between cities and their hinterland and between urban and rural
areas is a key aspect of regenerative cities.

The fundamental processes for implementation 
Beyond ensuring the long-term environmental
sustainability of urbanization, implementing the regenerative city also means creating
opportunities for local economic growth, enhanced liveability and well-being, better
public spaces, improved social equality and cohesion, greater democratic participation,
and stronger urban resilience.  The implementation of regenerative cities is
enabled by adopting a series of processes and policy solutions that create
cites which are dynamic centres of democracy, 
public engagement, human development, innovation, urban regeneration,
well-being, justice and equality. The key processes and
recommendations to pave the way towards the regenerative city include:
 Vision, leadership and long-term target setting
 Citizen participation and democracy
 Multi-stakeholder engagement and cross sectoral cooperation
 Multi-level governance and vertical coordination
 Enhanced targets and indicators
 Communication, education and behavioural change
 Improved research and connection to policy-making

Further reading 
 Girardet, Herbert (2015), Creating Regenerative Cities, Routledge, U.K.

References 

Urban renewal